The Sterling Highway is a  state highway in the south-central region of the U.S. state of Alaska, leading from the Seward Highway at Tern Lake Junction,  south of Anchorage, to Homer.

Route description
Construction of the highway began in 1947 and was completed in 1950.  The Sterling Highway is part of Alaska Route 1. It leads mainly west from Tern Lake to Soldotna, paralleling the Kenai River, at which point it turns south to follow the eastern shore of Cook Inlet. It is the only highway in the western and central Kenai Peninsula, and most of the population of the Kenai Peninsula Borough lives near it. The highway also gives access to many extremely popular fishing and recreation areas, including the Chugach National Forest, Kenai National Wildlife Refuge, and the   Kenai, Funny, and Russian rivers. The southern end of the highway is at the tip of the Homer Spit, a landspit extending  into Kachemak Bay. A ferry terminal here connects the road to the Alaska Marine Highway.

Interstate Highway System

Sterling Highway is part of the unsigned part of the Interstate Highway System as Interstate A-3.

Major intersections
Mileposts on the Seward Highway begin with Mile 37 (60 km), continuing from the mileposts of the Seward Highway. (The 0 (zero) mile marker for the Seward Highway is in downtown Seward, at the intersection of 3rd and Railway Avenues. Thus, mileposts along the Sterling Highway reflect distance from Seward, which is not actually on the Sterling Highway.

References

Interstate Highways in Alaska
Transportation in Kenai Peninsula Borough, Alaska
State highways in Alaska